SS Sea Marlin was a C3-S-A2 cargo ship operated for the War Shipping Administration (WSA) by Grace Lines during World War II. WSA allocated Sea Marlin to United States Army requirements. Sea Marlin was crewed by United States Merchant Marines, with a contingent of the US Naval Armed Guards for the guns and had a complement of the US Army Transportation Corps (Water Division) aboard for troop administration.

The ship was laid down 21 April 1943 for the U.S. Maritime Commission (USMC) as hull #401, USMC #857 at Ingalls Shipbuilding in Pascagoula Mississippi. Sea Marlin was launched on 27 September 1943, completed conversion to a 2,111 berth transport on 31 January 1944 and immediately delivered to WSA at Mobile, Alabama.

World War II 
Sea Marlin departed New Orleans on 9 February 1944 bound for the South West Pacific destinations including the ports of Townsville, Brisbane and  Sydney in Australia, Milne Bay, Langemak in New Guinea and Auckland, New Zealand. After return to San Francisco 28 April the ship departed in May for the New Guinea area with stops at Milne Bay, Oro Bay, Finschhafen, Langemak and Seeadler on Manus Island with a return to San Francisco 9 July 1944.

In the last half of 1944 the ship began supporting operations in the Central Pacific making two trips from San Francisco to Honolulu and then Eniwetok and Saipan via Honolulu August to October 1944. Shifting to Seattle the ship departed 30 November 1944 for Honolulu, Eniwetok and Saipan with the addition of calls at Tinian, Ulithi, Angaur, Peleliu, Manus Island, Guadalcanal, Noumea and Espiritu Santo with eventual return to San Francisco on 15 February 1945. On 10 March the ship again sailed for Honolulu, Eniwetok, Saipan,
Nouméa, Guadalcanal and Ulithi with the addition of Okinawa arriving back in San Francisco 19 July to depart again 31 July for Eniwetok and Ulithi with the addition of Manila. The ship was delayed for repairs there after a collision in Manila Bay with the T2 type tanker  on 26 August 1945. Sea Marlin reached Los Angeles on 13 November 1945. The last Pacific operation for Sea Marlin was departure from Los Angeles on 12 December for Okinawa and return 18 January 1946 to Portland, Oregon with 1,962 troops.

In February the ship transferred to the Atlantic making trips to Liverpool and Le Havre to return troops to the United States arriving in New York 1 April 1945. Sea Marlin then sailed for Norfolk, Virginia arriving 2 May for deactivation and lay up.

Among the units transported were: 17th Naval Construction Battalion & 31st Special Naval Construction Battalion (Seabees), 96th Infantry Division Headquarters personnel, Fuerza Aérea Expedicionaria Mexicana (Mexican Air Force) Escuadrón 201, 193rd Tank Battalion, and the US Army Air Force Sixth Bombardment Group.

Merchant ships did not receive battle stars but the ship's Naval Armed Guard received a Battle Star for the Assault and occupation of Okinawa Gunto for the period 24—30 June 1945.

Post War Service 
On May 2, 1946 Sea Marlin arrived at Norfolk for deactivation and entered the Reserve Fleet at Lee Hall, VA in the James River on 9 May. On 4 September the ship was removed from the reserve fleet under agreement with Moran Towing & Transportation Company for conversion under Maritime Commission contract to commercial configuration by the J.K Welding Company, Yonkers, NY for a cost of $300,000. Isthmian Steamship Company purchased Sea Marlin on 24 February 1947 for $1,280,730 changing its name to Steel Director. In 1956 the ship was sold to States Marine Lines and operated under the same name until scrapped in 1971. Steel Director departed Saigon, South Vietnam on 17 May 1971 for Kaohsiung, Republic of China prior where she was to be scrapped the next month.

Footnotes

References 

1943 ships
Type C3 ships
Ships built in Pascagoula, Mississippi
Merchant ships of the United States
United States Merchant Marine
Troop ships of the War Shipping Administration
World War II merchant ships of the United States